Elegantaspis reticornis is an arthrodire placoderm fish, which lived during the Early Devonian period in Spitsbergen, Norway.

References

Phlyctaeniidae
Fossils of Norway
Placoderms of Europe